Li Jianrou (born 15 August 1986 in Jilin City, Jilin Province) is a Chinese Short track Speed skater. She won a gold medal in the 500 m event of the 2014 Winter Olympics. She is the 2012 Overall World Champion. She represented China in the 2014 Winter Olympic's Ladies' 500 m event, 1000 m event and 1500 m event. She competed with China's women's relay team in the Ladies' 3000 m relay Finals and Semifinals.

Career
Li took up the sport at the age of 10 in her hometown, Jilin, China. Educated at the Northeast Normal University in Changchun, she joined the national team in 2007 under the coaching of Li Yan. Li made her debut at the 2010 Speed Skating World Cup for China and in 2011, she was given the Sports Honour medal. In 2014, she finally achieved her ambition of participating in the Sochi Winter Olympics.

International Competition Podiums

References

1986 births
Living people
Chinese female speed skaters
Chinese female short track speed skaters
Olympic short track speed skaters of China
Olympic gold medalists for China
Olympic medalists in short track speed skating
Short track speed skaters at the 2014 Winter Olympics
Medalists at the 2014 Winter Olympics
Universiade medalists in short track speed skating
Sportspeople from Jilin City
Universiade silver medalists for China
Universiade bronze medalists for China
Competitors at the 2011 Winter Universiade
20th-century Chinese women
21st-century Chinese women